The Mayor is an American television sitcom created by Jeremy Bronson. The series was produced by ABC Studios, with Bronson serving as showrunner. It aired on ABC from October 3 to December 12, 2017. The series stars Brandon Micheal Hall as Courtney Rose, an aspiring rapper who unwittingly becomes the mayor of his hometown after running to gain publicity for his music. Lea Michele and Yvette Nicole Brown also star, with newcomers Bernard David Jones and Marcel Spears. The pilot was ordered to series by ABC on May 11, 2017.

Despite receiving positive reviews from critics, ABC cancelled the series after just one season on January 4, 2018, citing dwindling DVR viewership and "political fatigue" among audiences. The remaining episodes were made available on a weekly basis on Hulu and then on ABC.com starting January 25, 2018.

Premise
Courtney Rose, a struggling hip-hop artist, runs for mayor of his California hometown, Fort Grey, in order to promote his music career. The real troubles begin when, unexpectedly, he wins the election.

Cast and characters

Main
 Brandon Micheal Hall as Courtney Rose: An aspiring rapper and the new mayor of Fort Grey, California.
 Lea Michele as Valentina "Val" Barella: Courtney's former classmate and current chief of staff. During the mayoral race, Val campaigned for Courtney's opponent, Ed Gunt.
 Bernard David Jones as Jermaine Leforge: Courtney's best friend and Fort Grey's communications director.
 Marcel Spears as T.K. Clifton: Courtney's best friend and Fort Grey's director of constituent services.
 Yvette Nicole Brown as Dina Rose: Courtney's mother, a postal worker who reads people's mail.

Recurring
 Jillian Armenante as Kitty Cavanaugh: One of Courtney's employees, hired by Val.
 David Spade as Ed Gunt: A councilman and Courtney's rival in the election.

Guest
 Daveed Diggs as Mac Etcetera: A hip-hop artist and Courtney's idol.
 Larry Joe Campbell as Dick: One of Courtney's employees, hired by Val.
 Larry Wilmore as Vern Corker: A fiscal analyst who works for the City Council.
 Anabel Munoz as Gabby Montoya
 Arsenio Hall as Reverend Ocho Okoye
 Kristen Johnston as Police Chief Fox

Episodes

Production

Development
The Mayor was pitched to the ABC network in the summer of 2016, and it has drawn some comparisons to the outcome of the 2016 U.S. presidential election as well as Donald Trump's presidential campaign and victory. The series' creator, Jeremy Bronson, has stated the show is not meant to be a parody or satire, but he has admitted that the pilot episode drew some inspiration from President Trump.

Casting
On January 26, 2017, Brandon Micheal Hall was cast as Courtney Rose. Lea Michele was cast as Valentina Barella on February 23, 2017. On March 16, 2017, Yvette Nicole Brown was cast as Dina Rose. Marcel Spears was cast as T.K. Clifton on May 16, 2017. On July 27, 2017, Bernard David Jones was cast as Jermaine Leforge.

Music
In addition to serving as an executive producer, Daveed Diggs wrote original music for the series.

Reception

Ratings

Critical response
The review aggregator website Rotten Tomatoes reported an approval rating of 81% based on 31 reviews, with an average rating of 7.66/10. The website's critical consensus reads, "The Mayor gets off to a promising start in its first season, elevated by a charmingly hopeful tone and political humor that reaches amiably across the aisle." Metacritic, which uses a weighted average, assigned a score of 72 out of 100 based on 19 critics, indicating "generally favorable reviews".

References

External links
 
 

2010s American black sitcoms
2010s American political comedy television series
2010s American single-camera sitcoms
2017 American television series debuts
2017 American television series endings
American Broadcasting Company original programming
English-language television shows
Television series by ABC Studios
Television shows set in California
Fictional mayors